Mohammadiyeh (also Romanized as Moḩammadīyeh; also known as Moḩammadī and Muhammadi) is a village in Manzariyeh Rural District, in the Central District of Shahreza County, Isfahan Province, Iran. At the 2006 census, its population was 34, in 10 families.

References 

Populated places in Shahreza County